Bogdan Radu Apostu (born 20 April 1982) is a Romanian former footballer who played as a forward. Apostu grew up at Corvinul Hunedoara well known football academy and played in his career for clubs such as: Corvinul Hunedoara, Oțelul Galați, UTA Arad, Farul Constanţa, Bnei Sakhnin, Nyíregyháza Spartacus, Pandurii Târgu Jiu, Petrolul Ploieşti or Universitatea Cluj, among others. After retirement Apostu started his career as a football agent. For almost a season he was also the general manager of Academica Clinceni.

References

External links 

 
 

1982 births
Living people
Sportspeople from Hunedoara
Romanian footballers
Association football forwards
Liga I players
Liga II players
CS Corvinul Hunedoara players
ASC Oțelul Galați players
FC UTA Arad players
FCV Farul Constanța players
FC Internațional Curtea de Argeș players
CS Pandurii Târgu Jiu players
FC Petrolul Ploiești players
ASA 2013 Târgu Mureș players
FC Universitatea Cluj players
FC Olimpia Satu Mare players
Nemzeti Bajnokság I players
Nyíregyháza Spartacus FC players
Diósgyőri VTK players
Israeli Premier League players
Bnei Sakhnin F.C. players
Romanian expatriate footballers
Romanian expatriate sportspeople in Hungary
Expatriate footballers in Hungary
Romanian expatriate sportspeople in Israel
Expatriate footballers in Israel